Rokytne Raion was a raion in Rivne Oblast in western Ukraine. Its administrative centre was the urban-type settlement of Rokytne. The raion was abolished and its territory was merged into Sarny Raion on 18 July 2020 as part of the administrative reform of Ukraine, which reduced the number of raions of Rivne Oblast to four. The last estimate of the raion population was

Demographics
Rokytne Raion was probably the place with the highest birth rate in all of Ukraine. The Raion recorded a birth rate of 24.0 per 1,000 in 2008. The village council of Hlynne is widely regarded as holding the record for the highest birth rate in all of Europe.

 Births (2011) : 1,304 births at 24.0 per 1,000
 Births (2012) : 1,391 births at 25.9 per 1,000
 Births (2014) : 1,328 births at 24.0 per 1,000
 Births (2016) : 1,177 births at 20.6 per 1,000
 Births (2017) : 1,064 births at 18.5 per 1,000
 Births (2018) : 1,050 births at 18.2 per 1,000
 Deaths (2011) : 615 deaths at 11.3 per 1,000
 Deaths (2012) : 595 deaths at 11.1 per 1,000
 Deaths (2014) : 617 deaths at 11.2 per 1,000
 Deaths (2016) : 607 deaths at 10.6 per 1,000
 Deaths (2017) : 593 deaths at 10.3 per 1,000
 Deaths (2018) : 575 deaths at 10.0 per 1,000

World War 2
On 26 August 1942, after living under a reign of terror for just over a year, the Jews of Rokytne were ordered to gather in the central market square for deportation to a killing site outside the town. When many of them realized what was about to occur, the crowd began to panic. As people began to run, Nazi and Ukrainian police began to shoot. People were systematically shot or herded into waiting rail cars, destined for Sarny. Jews were also forcibly transferred to Sarny from the towns of Tomashorod, Klesiv and Dubrovytsia.

This event is collectively referred to as part of the 1942 Sarny Massacre.

See also
 Subdivisions of Ukraine

References 

 Israel Greenberg, "Tearful Events" (Ala Gamulka, trans.). Contained in E. Leoni (ed.), Rokitno-Wolyn and Surroundings; Memorial Book and Testimony. Tel Aviv, 1967.

 Shmuel Spector, The Jews of Volhynia and their Reaction to Extermination. Yad Vashem, The Untold Stories: The Murder Sites of The Jews In the Occupied Territories of the Former USSR, pp. 159–186 at p. 161. Retrieved August 25, 2016.

External links
 rv.gov.ua 

Former raions of Rivne Oblast
1939 establishments in Ukraine
Ukrainian raions abolished during the 2020 administrative reform